A burrow is a hole made by an animal.

Burrow may also refer to:

Places 
 Burrow, a small mound or hillock
 Burrow (Shropshire), a hill in Shropshire, England
 Burrow-with-Burrow, a parish in Lancashire, England
 The Burrow, a fictional place in the Harry Potter series
 FAU Arena or The Burrow, the Florida Atlantic University Arena

Other uses 
 Burrow (surname)
 "The Burrow" (short story), a short story by Franz Kafka
 Burrowing (politics), a practice of giving jobs to political allies
 The Burrow, a supporter group for the South Sydney Rabbitohs club
 Burrow (film), a 2020 Pixar short film

See also
Burro, a small donkey
Borough, an administrative division
Burrows (disambiguation)